Kuchnia  is a village in the administrative district of Gmina Gniew, within Tczew County, Pomeranian Voivodeship, in northern Poland. It is located on the left bank of the Vistula river, within the ethnocultural region of Kociewie in the historic region of Pomerania.

The village has a population of 144.

History
During the German occupation of Poland (World War II), in 1941, the Einsatzkompanie Goten­hafen, Schutzpolizei and SS carried out expulsions of Poles, whose houses and farms were then handed over to German colonists as part of the Lebensraum policy. Expelled Poles were enslaved as forced labour and sent either to German colonists in the region or to Germany.

References

Populated places on the Vistula
Villages in Tczew County